The Kami are an ethnic and linguistic group in Morogoro Region, Tanzania.  In 2000 the Kami population was estimated to be 16,411.

The Kami language is a Bantu language, sharing substantial lexical similarities with Kutu, Kwere, Zaramo, Doe, and Luguru.

References

Ethnic groups in Tanzania
Indigenous peoples of East Africa